Beniram or Pandit Beniram was a Bhojpuri poet and a contemporary of Bharatendu Harishchandra. He used to compose Kajari and was a great composer of it. His notable work is Kajari Bidesiya which he composed during 1860s. He is credited to use to word Bidediya to address a person who has left the home and gone away for the first time in a folk song which he wrote in 1884.

References 

Indian writers
Bhojpuri-language writers